Revival is the second studio album by Canadian country music singer Tara Oram. It was released in Canada on July 19, 2011. The album features twelve tracks – eleven original songs and a cover of the Sheryl Crow song "Strong Enough." Oram co-wrote two of the tracks, "Can't Get Past" and "Overalls."

Track listing

References

2011 albums
Open Road Recordings albums
Tara Oram albums